Pirro Mani (born April 14, 1932), is an Albanian actor and theatre director. He is one of the most prominent personalities in the history of Albanian theater.He worked at the National Theatre of Albania for 25 years.

Biography 
He studied at the State Institute of Theatrical Arts, GITIS, Moscow. After returning to his homeland, he was appointed director of the “A. Mr. Çajupi ”, Korça, which he   managed for about eight years. From 1967 to 1992 he was the director of the National Theater, where he staged dozens of plays. In his artistic career he counts over 80 performances. He has been honored with many awards. He was known as a specialist in directing mass scenes, and of  mise-en-scène. The best known of his performances are "Cuca e maleve", "The Second Face", "Arturo Ui", "The General of the Dead Army", "The Age Before the Trial", "The 12th Night", "Prometheus", etc. He has also been involved in several feature films. He was honored with the title "People's Artist". He has been living in New York, USA since 2002, together with his wife, the  actress Pavlina Mani and his family.

References 

Albanian actors
Albanian directors